Megacyllene latreillei is a species of beetle in the family Cerambycidae. It was described by Laporte and Gory in 1835.

References

Megacyllene
Beetles described in 1835